Noureddine Zekri (born 1964 in Batna) is an Algerian football manager who last managed Damac in Saudi Professional League.

Zekri previously managed MC Alger in the Algerian Ligue Professionnelle 1 before resigning on July 10, 2011.

Managerial career
Zekri gained his coaching badges, a UEFA Pro License, in Italy's famous football coaching centre, the FIGC Settore Tecnico Coverciano.

Brera Calcio 
Zekri started coaching the newly born Milan-based team Brera Calcio in 2000 in Serie D, but he was sacked shortly after and replaced with Walter Zenga. He returned to Brera Calcio in 2005/2006 season and the following season he succeeded in getting the team promoted from Prima Categoria to Promozione, resigning immediately after.

ES Sétif 
On December 8, 2009, Zekri was announced as the coach of Algerian club ES Sétif.

In his first season, Zekri won the Algerian Cup, the North African Cup of Champions and the North African Super Cup.

However, On August 18, 2010, Zekri was sacked from his managerial position due to the poor results gained in the 2010 CAF Champions League group stage, picking up just one point out of the first three group matches. The 1-0 loss against Zimbabwe side Dynamos was the final straw for ES Sétif president Abdelhakim Serrar.

MC Alger
On March 11, 2011, Zekri was appointed as the coach of MC Alger, replacing outgoing Frenchman Alain Michel. He signed a 16-month contract with the club. In his first game as manager, MC Alger lost 4-1 to Dynamos F.C. of Zimbabwe in the first round of the 2011 CAF Champions League. However, the team managed to win the return leg 3-0 to qualify to the next round. On July 10, 2011, Zekri resigned from his position.

Managerial statistics

Honours

Manager
ES Sétif
Algerian Cup: 2009–10
North African Cup of Champions: 2009
North African Super Cup: 2010

References

External links
Noureddine Zekri at Footballdatabase

1964 births
Living people
Chaoui people
People from Batna Province
Algerian football managers
ES Sétif managers
MC Alger managers
Al-Ahly Shendi managers
Al-Wakrah SC managers
Al-Fayha FC managers
Damac FC managers
Saudi Professional League managers
Expatriate football managers in Italy
Algerian expatriate sportspeople in Italy
Expatriate football managers in Sudan
Algerian expatriate sportspeople in Sudan
Expatriate football managers in Saudi Arabia
Algerian expatriate sportspeople in Saudi Arabia
Expatriate football managers in Qatar
Algerian expatriate sportspeople in Qatar
21st-century Algerian people